Muriel Dorothy Butler  (née Norgrove, 24 April 1925 – 20 September 2015) was a New Zealand children's book author, bookseller, memoirist and reading advocate. She was a recipient of the Eleanor Farjeon Award.

Personal life
Butler was born in the Auckland suburb of Grey Lynn on 24 April 1925, the daughter of William Victor Norgrove and his wife Emily Isobel Norgrove (née Brown). She was educated at Auckland Girls' Grammar School, before studying at Auckland University College, from where she graduated with a Bachelor of Arts in 1947. She became engaged to her future husband, Roy Edward Butler, in August 1945, and they were married in 1947. They went on to have eight children together, six daughters and two sons.

Butler died on 20 September 2015 in Te Atatū Peninsula, Auckland.

Work
She founded the famed Dorothy Butler Children's Bookshop in Auckland which remains a going concern, albeit under new ownership. A brief history of the bookshop's early years was reported in the April 1977 issue of the Horn Book magazine.

Canadian writer Michele Landsberg described Butler's Babies Need Books as "a trail-blazing and completely accessible book, written with charm and vivacity and detailed, helpful advice" and said that Cushla and Her Books was notable as "a dramatic, true and detailed account of how the life of a multiply handicapped child was transformed through picture books. Indispensable for parents and teachers of handicapped children." Jim Trelease retold the story of Cushla in several editions of The Read-Aloud Handbook.

Honours and awards
Butler was awarded a Diploma in Education from the University of Auckland for her study of her severely handicapped granddaughter Cushla; this research was later adapted for publication as Cushla and Her Books.

Butler won the Children's Book Circle Eleanor Farjeon Award in 1980.

In 1992, Butler became the second recipient of the Margaret Mahy Award, whose winners present and publish a lecture concerning children's literature or literacy. Butler's lecture was titled Telling Tales. In 1991 she was awarded the Children's Literature Association's Award for Services to Children's Literature (now Betty Gilderdale Award).

In the 1993 New Year Honours, Butler was appointed an Officer of the Order of the British Empire, for services to children's literature.

Bibliography

Non-fiction
 Babies Need Books
 Children, Books and Families
 Cushla and Her Books
 Five to Eight: Vital Years for Reading
 Reading Begins at Home: Preparing Children for Reading Before They Go to School (with Marie Clay)

Autobiography
 There Was a Time
 All This and a Bookshop Too

Children's books

 Another Happy Tale
 Bears, Bears, Bears
 Behave Yourself, Martha
 Birthday Rain
 The Breakdown Day
 A Bundle of Birds
 By Jingo! A Tale of Old New Zealand
 Come Back Ginger: A Tale of Old New Zealand
 Davy's Ducks: A Tale of Old New Zealand
 Farm Boy, City Girl
 "Farmer Beetroot's Birthday"
 Farmyard Fiasco
 Good Morning, Mrs. Martin
 A Happy Tale
 Hector, an Old Bear
 Higgledy Piggledy Hobbledy Hoy
 Just a Dog
 The Little, Little Man
 Lulu
 My Brown Bear Barney
 My Brown Bear Barney at School
 My Brown Bear Barney at the Party
 My Brown Bear Barney in Trouble
 My Monkey Martha
 O'Reilly and the Real Bears
 Seadog: A Tale of Old New Zealand
 Smile Please, Martha
 What a Birthday!
 What Peculiar People!
 Where's Isabella?

Anthologies
 For Me, Me, Me: Poems for the Very Young
 I Will Build You a House: Poems
 The Magpies Said: Stories and Poems from New Zealand
 Reading for Enjoyment for 0-6 Year Olds

References 

 Du Chateau, Carroll, "Dorothy and her books," New Zealand Herald, 12 June 1999, page J4.

External links 
 Wheelers NZ: Books by Dorothy Butler

1925 births
2015 deaths
New Zealand children's writers
New Zealand Officers of the Order of the British Empire
University of Auckland alumni
New Zealand women children's writers
Writers from Auckland
People educated at Auckland Girls' Grammar School
New Zealand memoirists
Women memoirists
20th-century New Zealand writers
21st-century New Zealand writers
20th-century New Zealand women writers
21st-century New Zealand women writers
New Zealand booksellers